René Jacobs (born 30 October 1946) is a Belgian musician. He came to fame as a countertenor, but later in his career he became known as a conductor of baroque and classical opera.

Biography

Countertenor
Born in Ghent, Jacobs began his musical career as a boy chorister at the Cathedral. Later he studied classical philology at the University of Ghent while continuing to sing in Brussels and in The Hague.

The Kuijken brothers, Gustav Leonhardt and Alfred Deller all encouraged him to pursue a career as a countertenor, and he quickly became known as one of the best of his time. He recorded a large amount of less-known Baroque music by such composers as Antonio Cesti, d'India, Ferrari, Marenzio, Lambert, Guédron, William Lawes and others. He also sang in much-acclaimed recordings of the major works of Bach (such as the St Matthew Passion led by Gustav Leonhardt and Philippe Herreweghe).

Conductor
In 1977, he founded the ensemble Concerto Vocale.

As a conductor, Jacobs recorded numerous operas and sacred and secular works of the 16th, 17th and 18th centuries. His recording of Mozart's The Marriage of Figaro is especially renowned, having won such awards as Gramophones Record of the Year for 2004, Le Monde de la musiques Choc of the Year for 2004, a Grammy Award for "Best Opera recording of 2005", and two Midem Classical Awards in 2004. Other award-winning recordings include George Frideric Handel's Rinaldo (Cannes Classical Award, 2004), and Joseph Haydn's The Seasons (Diapason d’Or of 2005). The partial discography below lists some of the many other awards won by Jacobs' recordings.

His recordings and work have won numerous awards, including the Grammy Award for "Best Opera", Gramophones "Record of the Year", the "III Premio Traetta 2011", and numerous European awards. His recording of Mozart's The Magic Flute was Record of the Year at the inaugural International Classical Music Awards in April 2011.

He is particularly noted as a singer's conductor, and for his handling of recitative.

Jacobs regularly conducted such orchestras and ensembles as the Concerto Köln, the Orchestra of the Age of Enlightenment, Akademie für Alte Musik Berlin, Freiburger Barockorchester, Nederlands Kamerkoor and RIAS Kammerchor for recordings and concert tours. In 1992, the Berlin State Opera invited Jacobs to conduct there.

From 1991 to 2009, Jacobs was the artistic director of opera programs at Innsbruck's Festwochen der Alten Musik (Innsbruck Festival of Early Music). He also taught interpretation and Baroque singing style at the Schola Cantorum Basiliensis.

Partial discography

Countertenor
 Marc-Antoine Charpentier : 3 Leçons de Ténèbres du Mercredy Sainct, H.96, H.97, H.98, 3 Répons du Mercrediy Sainct, H.111, H.112, H.113, 3 Leçons de Ténèbres du Jeudy Sainct, H.102, H.103, H.109, Judith Nelson, Concerto Vocale (recorded 08/1977 and 01/1978) 3 LP Harmonia Mundi HM 1005/6/7
 Marc-Antoine Charpentier : 3 Leçons de Ténèbres du Vendredy Sainct, H.105, H.106, H.110, 6 Répons du Mercredy Sainct. H.114.H.115, H.116, H.117, H.118, H.119, Judith Nelson, Concerto Vocale (Volume 2, recorded 01/1978 and 01/1979) 2 LP Harmonia Mundi HM 1008/09
 Marc-Antoine Charpentier : Motets à voix seule et à 2 voix, Judith Nelson, Concerto vocale. CD Harmonia Mundi 1984 HMC 901149
Marc-Antoine Charpentier : David et Jonathas H 490, (La Pythonisse), English Bach Festival Orchestra, conducted by Michel Corboz – 2 CD Erato 1982 report 2010.
Christoph Willibald Gluck: Orfeo ed Euridice with Mariannne Kweksilber, Magdalena Falewicz, and La Petite Bande conducted by Sigiswald Kuijken, Collegium vocale – 2 LP Accent 1982
Georg Friedrich Händel: Tamerlano with John Elwes, Henri Ledroit, Mieke van der Sluis, Isabelle Poulenard, Gregory Reinhart, and La Grande Ecurie et La Chambre Du Roy conducted by Jean-Claude Malgoire – 3 LP CBS Masterworks 1984
Georg Friedrich Händel: Alessandro with Sophie Boulin, Isabelle Poulenard, Jean Nirouët, Stephen Varcoe, Guy de Mey, Ria Bollen, and La Petite Bande conducted by Sigiswald Kuijken – 4 LP Deutsche Harmonia Mundi 1985
Georg Friedrich Händel: Admeto with Jill Gomez, Rachel Yakar, James Bowman, Max van Egmond, Ulrik Cold, and Il Complesso Barocco conducted by Alan Curtis – 5 LP EMI 1978
Georg Friedrich Händel: Partenope with Krisztina Laki, John York Skinner, Helga Müller-Molinari, Stephen Varcoe, Martyn Hill, and La Petite Bande conducted by Sigiswald Kuijken – 4 LP Deutsche Harmonia Mundi 1979

Conductor
Bach – Mass in B minor
Bach – Christmas Oratorio (Choc du Monde de la Musique; ClassicsToday.com)
Bach – The Motets (award: Diapason d'Or)
Bach – Secular cantatas
Blow – Venus and Adonis
Buxtehude – Membra Jesu Nostri
Caldara – Maddalena ai piedi di Cristo (awards: Gramophone Award; Diapason d'or)
Cavalli – La Calisto (awards: Cannes Classical Award; Diapason d'or)
Cavalli – Giasone (1988)
Cavalli – Xerxes – (awards: Choc du Monde de la Musique; Diapason d'or; Un événement Télérama (ffff))
Cesti – Cantatas
Cesti – Orontea
Couperin – Leçons de Ténèbres
Gluck – Orfeo ed Euridice (awards: Cannes Classical Awards)
Grandi – Vulnerasti cor meum and other sacred music
Handel – Giulio Cesare
Handel- Messiah
Handel – Rinaldo ((awards: Cannes Classical Award)
Handel- Saul ((awards: Editor's choice Gramophone; Choc du Monde de la musique; BBC Music Magazine Disc of the Month (October 2005))
Handel – Orlando ((awards: DG Archiv)
Haydn – Die Jahreszeiten (awards: Choc du Monde de la Musique; Edison Classical Music Award; Gramophone Award)
Haydn – Die Schöpfung
Haydn – Symphonies Nos. 91 and 92 (awards: Choc du Monde de la Musique; Preis der deutschen Schallplattenkritik; Preis der deutschen Schallplattenkritik)
Keiser - Croesus (awards: Edison Classical Music Award; Diapaison d'or)
Monteverdi – L'Orfeo (awards: Choc 2006)
Monteverdi – Il ritorno d'Ulisse in patria (Diapason d'or; Preis der deutschen Schallplattenkritik)
Monteverdi – L'incoronazione di Poppea
Monteverdi – Vespro della beata Vergine
Monteverdi – Madrigals
Mozart – Così fan tutte (Cannes Classical Awards; Diapason d'or; Edison Classical Music Award)
Mozart – Le nozze di Figaro (awards: 47th Grammy Award; Choc du Monde de la Musique; Edison Classical Music Award; Gramophone Record of the Year 2004; Preis der deutschen Schallplattenkritik
Mozart – La clemenza di Tito (awards: Critics award at the Brits Classics 2007; 10 de Classica-Répertoire; Jahrespreis der Deutschen Schallplattenkritik; Un événement Télérama (ffff)
Mozart – Don Giovanni (awards: Gramophone Record of the Month, October 2007; Classics Today 10/10)
Mozart – Symphonies Nos. 38 and 41 (awards: 10 de Classica-Répertoire; Diapason d'Or Arte)
Mozart – Idomeneo (awards:  Scherzo, Choc de Classica, Un événement Télérama (ffff)
Pergolesi – Stabat Mater
Purcell – Dido and Aeneas; (awards: Editor's choice Gramophone; Un événement Télérama (ffff)
Scarlatti  – Il primo omicidio (overo caïn) (awards: Diapason d'or; Editor's choice Gramophone; Gramophone Award; Le Timbre de Platine
Scarlatti – Griselda (awards: 10 de Répertoire; Diapason d'or; Le Timbre de Platine)
Schubert – Symphonies 1 & 6, Pentatone PTC 5186707 (2018)
Schubert – Symphonies 2 & 3, Pentatone PTC 5186759 (2020) BBC Radio 3 Record Review Choice of Marina Frolova-Walker 03/10/2020
Schütz – Christmas Oratorio (awards: Diapason d'or; Un événement Télérama (ffff))
Zelenka – Magnificat & Lamenti

Literature 
 Jozef Robijns en Miep Zijlstra, Algemene Muziek Encyclopedie deel 5, Unieboek 1981, pagina 36
Kennedy, Michael (2006), The Oxford Dictionary of Music, 985 pages,  
 Nicolas Blanmont, René Jacobs, prima la musica, prime le parole, uitgave Versant Sud (2009)
 René Jacobs im Gespräch mit Silke Leopold: "Ich will Musik neu erzählen", Bärenreiter Henschel, Kassel 2013, .

References

1946 births
Living people
Belgian male singers
Belgian conductors (music)
Belgian male musicians
Male conductors (music)
Belgian opera singers
Edison Classical Music Awards winners
Grammy Award winners
Operatic countertenors
Belgian performers of early music
Musicians from Ghent
Academic staff of Schola Cantorum Basiliensis
Bach conductors
21st-century conductors (music)
Harmonia Mundi artists